Hsu Wei-chun (born 25 November 1991) is a Taiwanese karateka. He won one of the bronze medals in the men's kumite 75 kg event at the 2018 Asian Games held in Jakarta, Indonesia.

At the 2017 Asian Karate Championships held in Astana, Kazakhstan, he won the silver medal in the men's kumite 75 kg event. In the final, he lost against Bahman Asgari of Iran.

In 2021, he competed at the World Olympic Qualification Tournament held in Paris, France hoping to qualify for the 2020 Summer Olympics in Tokyo, Japan.

He competed in the men's kumite 75 kg event at the 2022 World Games held in Birmingham, United States.

Achievements

References 

Living people
1991 births
Place of birth missing (living people)
Taiwanese male karateka
Karateka at the 2018 Asian Games
Asian Games medalists in karate
Asian Games bronze medalists for Chinese Taipei
Medalists at the 2018 Asian Games
Competitors at the 2022 World Games
21st-century Taiwanese people